Ephoria liliana is a moth in the Apatelodidae family. It was described by Schaus in 1900. It is found in Brazil (Parana).

References

Natural History Museum Lepidoptera generic names catalog

Apatelodidae
Moths described in 1900